HD 77338 is a K-type subgiant star which has recently exhausted its hydrogen fuel and has started to expand. Its surface temperature is 5315 K. HD 77338 is enriched in its concentration of heavy elements compared to the Sun, with a metallicity Fe/H index of 0.16 but is much older at an age of 9.5 billion years.

HD 77338 is unusually enriched in heavy elements for a star of its age. The anomalously high abundance of ions of manganese may indicate the star has recently passed through the common shell stage (engulfed a planet).

Planetary system
In 2012, one planet, named HD 77338b, was discovered by the radial velocity method on a tight orbit with uncertain eccentricity. Its equilibrium temperature is 954.8 K.

References

Pyxis (constellation)
K-type subgiants
Planetary systems with one confirmed planet
J09011248-2531371
044291
CD-25 6797
077338